In automata theory (a branch of theoretical computer science), DFA minimization is the task of transforming a given deterministic finite automaton (DFA) into an equivalent DFA that has a minimum number of states. Here, two DFAs are called equivalent if they recognize the same regular language. Several different algorithms accomplishing this task are known and described in standard textbooks on automata theory.

Minimal DFA
For each regular language, there also exists a minimal automaton that accepts it, that is, a DFA with a minimum number of states and this DFA is unique (except that states can be given different names). The minimal DFA ensures minimal computational cost for tasks such as pattern matching.

There are two classes of states that can be removed or merged from the original DFA without affecting the language it accepts.
 Unreachable states are the states that are not reachable from the initial state of the DFA, for any input string. These states can be removed.
 Dead states are the states from which no final state is reachable. These states can be removed unless the automaton is required to be complete.
 Nondistinguishable states are those that cannot be distinguished from one another for any input string. These states can be merged.

DFA minimization is usually done in three steps:
 remove dead and unreachable states (this will accelerate the following step),
 merge nondistinguishable states,
 optionally, re-create a single dead state ("sink" state) if the resulting DFA is required to be complete.

Unreachable states

Reachable states can be obtained with the following algorithm:

let reachable_states := {q0}
let new_states := {q0}

do {
    temp := the empty set
    for each q in new_states do
        for each c in Σ do
            temp := temp ∪ {p such that p = δ(q,c)}
    new_states := temp \ reachable_states
    reachable_states := reachable_states ∪ new_states
} while (new_states ≠ the empty set)

unreachable_states := Q \ reachable_states

Unreachable states can be removed from the DFA without affecting the language that it accepts.

Nondistinguishable states

The following algorithms present various approaches to merging nondistinguishable states.

Hopcroft's algorithm
These groups represent equivalence classes of the Nerode congruence, whereby every two states are equivalent if they have the same behavior for every input sequence.

The following pseudocode describes the form of the algorithm as given by Xu.  Alternative forms have also been presented.

P := {F, Q \ F}
W := {F, Q \ F}

while (W is not empty) do
    choose and remove a set A from W
    for each c in Σ do
        let X be the set of states for which a transition on c leads to a state in A
        for each set Y in P for which X ∩ Y is nonempty and Y \ X is nonempty do
            replace Y in P by the two sets X ∩ Y and Y \ X
            if Y is in W
                replace Y in W by the same two sets
            else
                if |X ∩ Y| <= |Y \ X|
                    add X ∩ Y to W
                else
                    add Y \ X to W

The algorithm starts with a partition that is too coarse: every pair of states that are equivalent according to the Nerode congruence belong to the same set in the partition, but pairs that are inequivalent might also belong to the same set. It gradually refines the partition into a larger number of smaller sets, at each step splitting sets of states into pairs of subsets that are necessarily inequivalent.
The initial partition is a separation of the states into two subsets of states that clearly do not have the same behavior as each other: the accepting states and the rejecting states. When no more splits of this type can be found, the algorithm terminates.

Lemma. Given a fixed character c and an equivalence class Y that splits into equivalence classes B and C, only one of B or C is necessary to refine the whole partition.

Example: Suppose we have an equivalence class Y that splits into equivalence classes B and C. Suppose we also have classes D, E, and F; D and E have states with transitions into B on character c, while F has transitions into C on character c. By the Lemma, we can choose either B or C as the distinguisher, let's say B. Then the states of D and E are split by their transitions into B. But F, which doesn't point into B, simply doesn't split during the current iteration of the algorithm; it will be refined by other distinguisher(s).

Observation. All of B or C is necessary to split referring classes like D, E, and F correctly—subsets won't do.

The purpose of the outermost if statement (if Y is in W) is to patch up W, the set of distinguishers. We see in the previous statement in the algorithm that Y has just been split. If Y is in W, it has just become obsolete as a means to split classes in future iterations. So Y must be replaced by both splits because of the Observation above. If Y is not in W, however, only one of the two splits, not both, needs to be added to W because of the Lemma above. Choosing the smaller of the two splits guarantees that the new addition to W is no more than half the size of Y; this is the core of the Hopcroft algorithm: how it gets its speed, as explained in the next paragraph.

The partition refinement data structure allows each splitting step to be performed in time proportional to the number of transitions that participate in it. This remains the most efficient algorithm known for solving the problem, and for certain distributions of inputs its average-case complexity is even better, .

Once Hopcroft's algorithm has been used to group the states of the input DFA into equivalence classes, the minimum DFA can be constructed by forming one state for each equivalence class. The initial state of the minimum DFA is the one containing the initial state of the input DFA, and the accepting states of the minimum DFA are the ones whose members are accepting states of the input DFA.

Moore's algorithm

Like Hopcroft's algorithm, it maintains a partition that starts off separating the accepting from the rejecting states, and repeatedly refines the partition until no more refinements can be made. At each step, it replaces the current partition with the coarsest common refinement of  partitions, one of which is the current one and the rest of which are the preimages of the current partition under the transition functions for each of the input symbols. The algorithm terminates when this replacement does not change the current partition. Its worst-case time complexity is : each step of the algorithm may be performed in time  using a variant of radix sort to reorder the states so that states in the same set of the new partition are consecutive in the ordering, and there are at most  steps since each one but the last increases the number of sets in the partition. The instances of the DFA minimization problem that cause the worst-case behavior are the same as for Hopcroft's algorithm.

Brzozowski's algorithm
Reversing the transitions of a non-deterministic finite automaton (NFA)  and switching initial and final states produces an NFA  for the reversal of the original language. Converting this NFA to a DFA using the standard powerset construction (keeping only the reachable states of the converted DFA) leads to a DFA  for the same reversed language. As  observed, repeating this reversal and determinization a second time, again keeping only reachable states, produces the minimal DFA for the original language.

The intuition behind the algorithm is this: determinizing the reverse automaton merges states that are nondistinguishable in the original automaton, but may merge also states that should not be merged (i.e., are not merged in the minimal DFA). In such case, after we reverse the automaton for the second time, it may not be deterministic. That is why we need to determinize it again, obtaining the minimal DFA.

Proof of correctness

After we determinize  to obtain , we reverse this  to obtain . This follows from  being deterministic, viz. there are no two states in  that we can reach from the initial state through the same word. We see that this holds for each pair of powerstates, and thus each powerstate is distinguishable from every other powerstate.

If  is already deterministic, then it suffices to trim it, reverse it, determinize it, and then reverse it again. Now all that's left to do is to reverse  to obtain the minimal DFA for the original language.

Complexity

The worst-case complexity of Brzozowski's algorithm is exponential in the number of states of the input automaton. This holds regardless of whether the input is a NFA or a DFA. In the case of DFA, the exponential explosion can happen during determinization of the reversal of the input automaton; in the case of NFA, it can also happen during the initial determinization of the input automaton. However, the algorithm frequently performs better than this worst case would suggest.

NFA minimization

While the above procedures work for DFAs, the method of partitioning does not work for non-deterministic finite automata (NFAs). While an exhaustive search may minimize an NFA, there is no polynomial-time algorithm to minimize general NFAs unless P=PSPACE, an unsolved conjecture in computational complexity theory that is widely believed to be false. However, there are methods of NFA minimization that may be more efficient than brute force search.

See also
 State encoding for low power

Notes

References
.

.
.
.
. See also preliminary version, Technical Report STAN-CS-71-190, Stanford University, Computer Science Department, January 1971.
 
.
.
.
.
 
.

External links 
 DFA minimization using the Myhill–Nerode theorem

Finite automata
Articles with example pseudocode